Hyperion Records is an independent British classical record label.

History
Hyperion is a British classical label established in 1980 with the goal of showcasing recordings of music in all genres from the 12th century to the 21st. The company was named after Hyperion, one of the Titans of Greek mythology. It was founded by George Edward Perry, known as "Ted". Early LP releases included rarely recorded 20th-century British music by composers such as Robin Milford, Alan Bush and Michael Berkeley. The venture's success was sealed with a critically acclaimed and popular disc of music by Hildegard of Bingen, A Feather on the Breath of God (1985), directed by the medievalist Christopher Page and his group Gothic Voices. 

After the death on 9 February 2003 of Hyperion Records founder Ted Perry, his son Simon Perry took over as director.

Acquisition by Universal Music Group
Entries at Companies House show that, on 14 February 2023, ownership of Hyperion moved to Universal Music Operations Limited, a primary British subsidiary of Universal Music Group (UMG). UMG officially announced the acquisition on 15 March 2023, making Hyperion a sister label of Deutsche Grammophon and Decca.

Recognition
Hyperion became renowned for recording lesser-known works, particularly Romantic piano concertos that had fallen from the repertory, works by Scottish Romantic composers, and English music of the Renaissance to the Baroque. They are especially known for their series of recordings of Franz Liszt's complete music for solo piano recorded by Leslie Howard, their complete edition of Franz Schubert's lieder prepared under the supervision of the accompanist Graham Johnson OBE, and many of Handel's oratorios and Henry Purcell's choral works under the direction of Robert King. More recently, Stephen Hough CBE recorded Rachmaninov's complete piano concertos and the Paganini Rhapsody using the composer's original score. Hyperion is also noted for the breadth of its recorded repertoire, including music from the 12th to the 21st centuries. The label is renowned for complete recordings of lieder by Carl Loewe, Robert Schumann, Felix Mendelssohn, Richard Strauss, and Franz Liszt. More recently, Hyperion launched Romantic violin concerto and Romantic cello concerto series.

Canadian pianist Angela Hewitt OBE recorded a complete cycle of Bach's keyboard works for the label (including the Well-Tempered Clavier twice over), while Christopher Herrick recorded his complete organ works.

Hyperion's recordings have won many awards, among them several Gramophone Awards, including Record of the Year in 1996, 1998, 2002 and 2010. Ted Perry was voted into the Gramophone Hall of Fame in April 2012.

Sawkins lawsuit

In 2004, Hyperion became embroiled in a legal dispute with Lionel Sawkins, a music editor whose editions of works by Michel-Richard de Lalande had been used in Hyperion's recording of the composer's music. Sawkins sued the company for royalties accruing from his musical copyright in these editions. Hyperion maintained that the editions were not original compositions and therefore were not subject to copyright, and further that Sawkins did receive payment in the form of a hire fee from the performers for their rental. The case came to court in May 2004 and the judgment went largely in Sawkins's favour. Hyperion appealed in March 2005, and the court upheld the original judgment. While the damages Sawkins sought were thought to be small, the legal costs of the case were estimated to result in a liability to the company of hundreds of thousands of pounds Sterling, making its future uncertain at the time. By 2006, Hyperion had received financial support from musicians, consumers, and composers to enable its survival. As a precedent-setting case, the judgment was criticised by many musicologists. Peter Phillips, the director of the Tallis Scholars and a music editor, said: "All the music I perform has to be edited, or we couldn't read it. But copyright should be there ... to reward creativity, not scholarship or diligence. How much an editor did or did not write should never be asked and judged upon during a million-pound lawsuit involving a small and innovative recording company."

See also
 Lists of record labels
 List of independent UK record labels

References

External links
 Hyperion Records' official web site
 Interview with (founder) Ted Perry, 25 September 1990
 Legal Judgments
 Original case which concluded in May 2004: 
 Appeal which concluded in March 2005: 

Classical music record labels
British independent record labels
Copyright case law
Record labels established in 1980
IFPI members
1980 establishments in the United Kingdom